Megachile roepkei is a species of bee in the family Megachilidae. It was described by Friese in 1914.

References

Roepkei
Insects described in 1914